The Great Plague of 1738 was an outbreak of the bubonic plague between 1738 and 1740 that affected areas of the Habsburg Empire, now in the modern nations of Romania, Hungary, Ukraine, Serbia, Croatia, Slovakia, Czechia and Austria. Although no exact figure is available, the epidemic likely killed over 50,000 people.

In February 1738 the plague hit the Banat region, having been spread there by the Imperial Army.

According to the 1740 Hungarian Diet, the Great Plague claimed 36,000 lives.

Southeastern Transylvania may have been the hardest area hit. Over the following eight years, the plague killed a sixth of the population of Timișoara. Timișoara's St. Mary and St. John of Nepomuk Monument is dedicated to the plague's victims. The plague would return to hit the city again in 1762–1763.

Other cities in the region were also stricken. Between October 1737 and April 1738, 111 deaths were reported in Zărneşti, and 70 in Codlea. More than 10% of the population of Cluj-Napoca was reported to have been killed by the pandemic.

The disease's spread extended to the Adriatic. It made its way to the island of Brač in modern-day Croatia.

See also
 Black Death
 Bubonic plague
 Second plague pandemic

References

1738 disease outbreaks
1738 in the Habsburg monarchy
Second plague pandemic

18th-century health disasters
18th-century epidemics
18th century in Bulgaria
18th century in Croatia
18th century in Hungary
Health disasters in Romania